Ski Montcalm is an alpine ski resort in Rawdon, Québec, Canada. The mountain, which is in the Lanaudière region, has operated since 1969. The ski area is distributed on three mountainsides, with twenty-four trails. Ski Montcalm is a member of the Quebec Ski Area Association (ASSQ).

History
Ski Montcalm was opened by Tadek Barnowski in 1969, just a few years after immigrating from Poland. Ski Montcalm is one of the few hills that remains family-owned, Barnowski having passed the ownership down to his children, John and Joanna.

A covered ramp was installed before the beginning of the 2019 ski season, allowing young skiers to get up the training hill more comfortably. This type of technology is a first in Canada. A similar covered ramp was installed in Europe at Chamonix.

During the 2019-2020 winter season, there are numerous activities organized by the ski resort to celebrate their 50th year in operation.

In 2019, Ski Montcalm has joined the OuiCanSki program, the goal of which is to initiate new Canadians to snow sports.

Activities

Ski Montcalm offers several types of activities and services.

Skiing and snowboarding equipment rentals are available on site.

Lessons of all levels, delivered by certified instructors, are available. Certifying organizations include the Canadian Ski Instructors' Alliance and the Canadian Association of Snowboard Instructors.

Advanced first aid and rescue services are delivered by volunteer ski patrollers certified by the Canadian Ski Patrol.

Lockers to store skiing equipment can be rented during the ski season.

Cafeteria services are available during hours of operation.

Ski Montcalm also offers to rent the newly renovated lodge for celebrations such as weddings and reunions.

See also
 Canadian Ski Instructors' Alliance
 Canadian Ski Patrol
 List of ski areas and resorts in Canada

References

External links
 Official website

Ski areas and resorts in Quebec
Lanaudière